Edward Anthony Spitzka (June 17, 1876 – September 4, 1922) was an American anatomist who autopsied (29 Oct 1901) the brain of Leon Czolgosz, the assassin of president William McKinley. (In 1881, his father Edward Charles Spitzka, a famous neurologist and medical specialist in mental diseases, testified to the insanity of Charles Guiteau, the assassin of President James A. Garfield, at Guiteau's murder trial.)

Dr. Edward Anthony Spitzka was the author of 40 papers on brain anatomy. Widely recognized as one of the world's leading brain anatomists, he directed the Baugh Institute of Anatomy until 1914. Dr. Spitzka performed post mortem examinations of the brains of many distinguished American men, including Prof. Edward Drinker Cope, Prof. Joseph Leidy, Prof. Harrison Allen, Dr. William Pepper, George Francis Train, and Major John Wesley Powell.

Publications
Co-edited (with J.C. DaCosta) Seventeenth American Edition of Gray's Anatomy (Sept. 1908).
Edited Eighteenth American Edition of Gray's Anatomy (Oct. 1910).
Edited Nineteenth American Edition of Gray's Anatomy (July 1913).
Spitzka, Edward A.  “The Mesial Relations of the Inflected Fissure: Observations upon One Hundred Brains,” New York Medical Journal (1901): 6-10.
Spitzka, Edward A.  “A Contribution to the Fissural Integrality of the Paroccipital: Observations upon One Hundred Brains,” The Journal of Mental Pathology (1901): 25-33.
Spitzka, Edward A.  “Preliminary report with Projection Drawings Illustrating the Topography of the Paracœles in their Relation to the Surface of the Cerebrum and Cranium,” New York Medical Journal (1901): 177-182.
Spitzka, Edward A.  “The Redundancy of the Preinsula in the Brains of Distinguished Educated Men,” The Medical Record (1901): 940-943.
Spitzka, Edward A.  “A Preliminary Communication of a Study of the Brains of Two Distinguished Physicians, Father and Son [Edouard Seguin and Edouard C. Seguin],” The Philadelphia Medical Journal (1901): 680-688.
Spitzka, Edward A.  “Is the Central Fissure Duplicated in the Brain of Carlo Giacomini, Anatomist? A Note on a Fissural Anomaly,” The Philadelphia Medical Journal (1901): 319-323.
Spitzka, Edward A.  “The Czolgosz Case,” The Philadelphia Medical Journal (1901): 693-695.
Spitzka, Edward A.  “Contributions to the Encephalic Anatomy of the Races,” American Journal of Anatomy (1901-1902): 516.
Spitzka, Edward A.  “The Post-Mortem Examination of Leon F. Czolgosz, the Assassin of President McKinley,” American Journal of Insanity (1901-1902): 386-404.
Spitzka, Edward A.  “Remarks on the Czolgosz Case and Allied Questions as Presented by [E.S.] Talbot,” The Medical Critic (1902): 17-28.
Spitzka, Edward A.  “Brain-weights of Animals with Special Reference to the Weights of the Brain of the Macaque Monkey,” The Journal of Comparative Neurology (1903): 9-17.
Spitzka, Edward A.  “The Postorbital Limbus: A Formation Occasionally met with at the Base of the Human Brain,” The Philadelphia Medical Journal (1903): 646-648.
Spitzka, Edward A.  “A Study of the Brain-weights of Men Notable in the Professions, Arts and Sciences,” The Philadelphia Medical Journal (1903): 757-761.
Spitzka, Edward A.  “Autopsy on Electrocuted Criminal, Toni Turckofski, a Polish Murderer, Executed at Sing Sing Prison, Aug., 1903,” The Medical Critic (1903): 1200-1203.
Spitzka, Edward A.  “The Brain of a Swedish Statesman,” Science (1904): 612.
Spitzka, Edward A.  “The Brain of the Histologist and Physiologist, Otto C. Lovén,” Science (1904): 994.
Spitzka, Edward A.  “Preliminary Note on the Brains of Natives of the Andaman and Nicobar Islands,” Proceedings of the American Philosophical Society (1908): 51-58.
Spitzka, Edward A.  “Infliction of Death Penalty by Electricity,” Proceedings of the American Philosophical Society (1908): 39-50.
Spitzka, Edward A.  “The Resuscitation of Persons Shocked by Electricity,” The Journal of the Medical Society of New Jersey (1908-1909): 549-555.
Spitzka, Edward A., and H.E. Radasch.  “Brain Lesions Produced by Electricity as Observed after Legal Electrocution,” The American Journal of the Medical Sciences (1912): 341-347.
Spitzka, Edward A.  “Depletion of Nerve Force in Neurasthenic States and Eye-strain, Reflex Headaches and Ocular Vertigo,” The Optical Journal and Review of Optometry (1916): 909-913.

References

External links
 

1876 births
1922 deaths
American anatomists
Assassination of William McKinley